The 1904–05 Federal Amateur Hockey League (FAHL) season lasted from December 31, 1904, until March 3. Teams played an eight-game schedule.

League business 
The Ottawa Hockey Club, who officially joined the FAHL prior to the end of the last season, played its first full season in the league. Montreal Le National left the league and joined the rival Canadian Amateur Hockey League (CAHL). Ottawa had negotiated with the CAHL to return, along with the Wanderers joining, but this was turned down. The Ottawa Capitals also left the FAHL.

Pre-season
The Wanderers played an exhibition series in New York City in December 1904. One game, versus the New York City Athletic Club, was noted for its rough play by the Wanderers.

Regular season 

The newly transferred Ottawa Hockey Club won the league championship – and retained the Stanley Cup – with a record of seven wins and one loss.

Highlights 

Ottawa's Frank McGee scored five goals against the Montagnards on February 4.

Final standings

Results 

† Ottawa HC lock down League Championship, retain Stanley Cup.

Goaltending averages

Scoring leaders

Stanley Cup challenges

Ottawa vs. Dawson City 
The Klondike Hockey Club, in a letter dated August 24, 1904, from team president Weldy Young, a former Ottawa player, issued a challenge to the Ottawa Hockey Club. The Dawson City team had won no championships and was not a member of any recognized senior league, yet Stanley Cup trustees P.D. Ross and JohnSweetland approved the challenge. Author Paul Kitchen has speculated that the series was approved because Young knew both Ross and federal government minister Clifford Sifton.

In January 1905, the Dawson City Nuggets travelled 4,000 miles (6,400 km) from the Yukon to Ottawa for a best-of-three Cup challenge series. The Nuggets actually left Dawson City on December 19, 1904, and travelled on a month-long journey by dog sled (Dawson to Whitehorse), ship (Skagway to Vancouver), and train (Whitehorse to Skagway, and Vancouver to Ottawa). The team was no match for the Silver Seven. Ottawa defeated them in the first game, 9–2. Numerous Stanley Cup records were then set in game two, including Frank McGee's 14 goals, which included eight consecutive goals scored in less than nine minutes, and a 23–2 rout, the largest margin of victory for any challenge game or Stanley Cup Final game to date.

Several players playing for Dawson were from the Ottawa area. Jim Johnstone was from Ottawa. Norman Watt was from Aylmer, Quebec. Randy McLennan had played in a Stanley Cup challenge for Queen's University of Kingston, Ontario. Another player has Stanley Cup challenge experience: Lorne Hanna, "formerly of the Yukon", had played for Brandon Wheat City in their 1904 challenge of Ottawa.

Sources:
 The Globe, January 14, 1905
 Fischler

Sources:
 The Globe, January 17, 1905
 Fischler

After the series, Ottawa held a banquet for Dawson City at the Ottawa Amateur Athletic Association (OAAA) clubhouse. There is a Stanley Cup legend that after the banquet, the Stanley Cup was drop kicked into the frozen Rideau Canal nearby and retrieved the next day. However, Bill Westwick, Ottawa Journal sports editor and the son of Silver Seven player Rat Westwick, and NHL commissioner Frank Calder both deny it ever happened.

Ottawa vs. Rat Portage Thistles 

In March 1905, the Rat Portage Thistles issued another challenge to the Ottawas. McGee did not play in the first game and the Thistles crushed Ottawa, 9–3. However, he returned to lead Ottawa to 4–2 and 5–4 victories in games two and three, respectively. McGee returned in game two, with his good forearm wrapped in a cast, and only a light bandage on his broken wrist, to decoy the Thistles. Alf Smith scored three goals in game two on slow ice, which the Thistles claimed was salted to slow down the Thistles. There was hard ice in game three, and the lead exchanged hands several times. The Thistles led 2–1 at halftime and 3–2 midway through the second half. Ottawa took a 4–3 lead, before Tommy Phillips scored his third of the game to tie the score. However, McGee came through with the winning score late in the game to win it for Ottawa.

 Spare - Rat Portage - Roxy Beaudro -LW/D
 Spare - Ottawa - Arthur "Bones" Allen -D, Billy Bawlf -F Bill Gilmore -LW, Fred White -F

 Spare - Rat Portage - Roxy Beaudro - LW/D
 Spare - Ottawa - Arthur "Bones" Allen -D, Billy Bawlf -F, Hamby Shore -RW, Fred White -F

 Spare - Rat Portage - Roxy Beaudro - LW/D
 Spare - Ottawa - Arthur "Bones" Allen - D, Billy Bawft - F, Hamby Shore - RW, Fred White - F

Stanley Cup engraving 
The following Ottawa Hockey Club players and staff were members of the Stanley Cup winning team.
1905 Ottawa Hockey Club Silver Sevents

See also 
 List of Stanley Cup challenge games
 List of Stanley Cup champions
 List of pre-NHL seasons
 List of ice hockey leagues
 1905 CAHL season

References

Bibliography 
 
 
 
 
 
 

Federal Amateur Hockey League seasons
FAHL